William Ernest McKibben (born December 8, 1960) is an American environmentalist, author, and journalist who has written extensively on the impact of global warming. He is the Schumann Distinguished Scholar at Middlebury College and leader of the climate campaign group 350.org. He has authored a dozen books about the environment, including his first, The End of Nature (1989), about climate change, and Falter: Has the Human Game Begun to Play Itself Out? (2019), about the state of the environmental challenges facing humanity and future prospects.

In 2009, he led 350.org's organization of 5,200 simultaneous demonstrations in 181 countries. In 2010, McKibben and 350.org conceived the 10/10/10 Global Work Party, which convened more than 7,000 events in 188 countries, as he had told a large gathering at Warren Wilson College shortly before the event. In December 2010, 350.org coordinated a planet-scale art project, with many of the 20 works visible from satellites. In 2011 and 2012 he led the environmental campaign against the proposed Keystone XL pipeline project and spent three days in jail in Washington, D.C. Two weeks later he was inducted into the literature section of the American Academy of Arts and Sciences.

He was awarded the Gandhi Peace Award in 2013. Foreign Policy magazine named him to its inaugural list of the 100 most important global thinkers in 2009 and MSN named him one of the dozen most influential men of 2009. In 2010, the Boston Globe called him "probably the nation's leading environmentalist"  and Time magazine book reviewer Bryan Walsh described him as "the world's best green journalist". In 2014, he was awarded the Right Livelihood Award for "mobilizing growing popular support in the USA and around the world for strong action to counter the threat of global climate change." He has been mentioned as a possible future Secretary of the Interior or Secretary of Energy should a progressive be elected President.

Early life
McKibben was born in Palo Alto, California. His family later moved to the Boston suburb of Lexington, Massachusetts, where he attended high school. His father, who once, in 1971, had been arrested during a protest in support of Vietnam veterans against the war, wrote for Business Week, before becoming business editor at The Boston Globe, in 1980. As a high school student, McKibben wrote for the local paper and participated in statewide debate competitions. Entering Harvard College in 1978, he became an editor of The Harvard Crimson and was chosen president of the paper for the calendar year 1981.

In 1980, following the election of Ronald Reagan, he determined to dedicate his life to the environmental cause.

Graduating in 1982, he worked for five years for The New Yorker as a staff writer, writing much of the Talk of the Town column from 1982 to early 1987. Inspired by the Gospel of Matthew, he became an advocate of nonviolent resistance. While doing a story on the homeless, he lived on the streets; there, he met his wife, Sue Halpern, who was working as a homeless advocate. In 1987, McKibben quit The New Yorker after longtime editor William Shawn was forced out of his job.  He and his family shortly after moved to a remote spot in the Southeastern Adirondacks of upstate New York, where he began to work as a freelance writer.

Writing
McKibben began his freelance writing career at about the same time that climate change appeared on the public agenda following the hot summer and fires of 1988 and testimony by James Hansen before the United States Senate Committee on Energy and Natural Resources in June of that year. His first contribution to the debate was a brief list of literature on the subject and commentary published December 1988 in The New York Review of Books and a question, "Is the World Getting Hotter?"

He became and remains a frequent contributor to various publications, including The New York Times, The Atlantic, Harper's, Orion, Mother Jones, The American Prospect, The New York Review of Books, Granta, National Geographic, Rolling Stone, Adbusters, and  Outside. He is also a board member at and contributor to Grist.

His first book, The End of Nature, was published in 1989 by Random House after being serialized in The New Yorker. Described by Ray Murphy of the Boston Globe as a "righteous jeremiad," the book excited much critical comment, pro and con; was for many people their first introduction to the question of climate change; and the inspiration for a great deal of writing and publishing by others. It has been printed in more than 20 languages. Several editions have come out in the United States, including an updated version published in 2006.

In 1992, The Age of Missing Information was published. It is an account of an experiment in which McKibben collected everything that came across the 100 channels of cable TV on the Fairfax, Virginia, system (at the time among the nation's largest) for a single day. He spent a year watching the 2,400 hours of programming, and then compared it to a day spent on the mountaintop near his home. This book has been widely used in colleges and high schools and was reissued in a new edition in 2006.

Subsequent books include Hope, Human and Wild, about Curitiba, Brazil, and Kerala, India, which he cites as examples of people living more lightly on the earth; The Comforting Whirlwind: God, Job, and the Scale of Creation, which is about the Book of Job and the environment; Maybe One, about human population; Long Distance: A Year of Living Strenuously, about a year spent training for endurance events at an elite level; and Enough, about what he sees as the existential dangers of genetic engineering and nanotechnology. Speaking about Long Distance at the Cambridge Forum, McKibben cited the work of Mihaly Csikszentmihalyi and Csikszentmihalyi's idea of "flow" relative to feelings McKibben had had—"taking a break from saving the world", he joked—as he immersed himself in cross-country skiing competitions.

Wandering Home is about a long solo hiking trip from his home in the mountains east of Lake Champlain in Ripton, Vermont, back to his longtime neighborhood of the Adirondacks. His book Deep Economy: the Wealth of Communities and the Durable Future, published in March 2007, was a national bestseller. It addresses what he sees as shortcomings of the growth economy and envisions a transition to more local-scale enterprise.

In fall 2007, he published, with the other members of his Step It Up team, Fight Global Warming Now, a handbook for activists trying to organize their local communities. In 2008, came The Bill McKibben Reader: Pieces from an Active Life, a collection of essays spanning his career. Also in 2008, the Library of America published "American Earth," an anthology of American environmental writing since Thoreau edited by McKibben.
In 2010, he published another national bestseller, Eaarth: Making a Life on a Tough New Planet, an account of the rapid onset of climate change. It was excerpted in Scientific American.

In 2019, McKibben published Falter: Has the Human Game Begun to Play Itself Out?, which details the growing concerns over climate change, how the Koch Brothers are contributing to an increase in carbon emissions by funding oil companies, and his concern with libertarianism, which he argues was sparked by the politics of the Reagan Revolution. He frequently argues that the Nordic model is preferable to a deregulated capitalist system, and that rapid innovation may come to hurt humanity.

In 2022, he published two books. We Are Better Together is a picture book for children celebrating the power of human cooperation and the beauty of life on Earth, illustrated by artist Stevie Lewis. The Flag, the Cross, and the Station Wagon: A Graying American Looks Back at His Suburban Boyhood and Wonders What the Hell Happened is a personal memoir that also digs into America's history to reflect on what has brought us to the present environmental crisis.

Some of McKibben's work has been extremely popular; an article in Rolling Stone in July 2012 received over 125,000 likes on Facebook, 14,000 tweets, and 5,000 comments.

Environmental campaigns

Step It Up
Step It Up 2007 was a nationwide environmental campaign started by McKibben to demand action on global warming by the U.S. Congress.

In late summer 2006 he helped lead a five-day walk across Vermont to call for action on global warming. Beginning in January 2007, he founded Step It Up 2007, which organized rallies in hundreds of American cities and towns on April 14, 2007, to demand that Congress enact curbs on carbon emissions by 80 percent by 2050. The campaign quickly won widespread support from a wide variety of environmental, student, and religious groups.

In August 2007 McKibben announced Step It Up 2, to take place November 3, 2007. In addition to the 80% by 2050 slogan from the first campaign, the second adds "10% [reduction of emissions] in three years ("Hit the Ground Running"), a moratorium on new coal-fired power plants, and a Green Jobs Corps to help fix homes and businesses so those targets can be met" (called "Green Jobs Now, and No New Coal").

350.org

In the wake of Step It Up's achievements, the same team announced a new campaign in March 2008 called 350.org. The organizing effort, aimed at the entire globe, drew its name from climate scientist James E. Hansen's contention earlier that winter that any atmospheric concentration of carbon dioxide (CO2) above 350 parts per million was unsafe. "If humanity wishes to preserve a planet similar to that on which civilization developed and to which life on Earth is adapted, paleoclimate evidence and ongoing climate change suggest that CO2 will need to be reduced from its current 385 ppm to at most 350 ppm, but likely less than that." Hansen et al. stated in the Abstract to their paper.

350.org, which has offices and organizers in North America, Europe, Asia, Africa and South America, attempted to spread that 350 number in advance of international climate meetings in December 2009 in Copenhagen. It was widely covered in the media. On Oct. 24, 2009, it coordinated more than 5,200 demonstrations in 181 countries, and was widely lauded for its creative use of internet tools, with the website Critical Mass declaring that it was "one of the strongest examples of social media optimization the world has ever seen."  Foreign Policy magazine called it "the largest ever global coordinated rally of any kind."

Subsequently, the organization continued its work, with the Global Work Party on 10/10/10 (10 October 2010). As of 2022, McKibben is a senior advisor to 350.0rg and May Boeve is the Executive Director.

Keystone XL
McKibben is one of the environmentalists against the proposed Canadian-U.S. Keystone XL pipeline project.

People's Climate March

On May 21, 2014, McKibben published an article on the website of Rolling Stone magazine (later appearing in the magazine's print issue of June 5), titled "A Call to Arms", which invited readers to a major climate march (later dubbed the People's Climate March) in New York City on the weekend of September 20–21, as part of the People's Climate Movement. In the article, McKibben calls climate change "the biggest crisis our civilization has ever faced", and predicts that the march will be "the largest demonstration yet of human resolve in the face of climate change".

On Sunday, July 5, 2015, McKibben led a similar climate march in Toronto, Ontario, with the support of various celebrities.

Electoral politics
During the 2016 Democratic presidential primary campaigns, McKibben served as a political surrogate for Vermont Senator Bernie Sanders. Sanders appointed him to the committee charged with writing the Democratic Party's platform for 2016. After Sanders' defeat by Hillary Clinton, McKibben endorsed her and spoke at their first joint event in Portsmouth, New Hampshire. He has been mentioned as a potential future Cabinet member should Sanders win the presidency.

Keynotes 
In 2020, McKibben delivered a keynote at 2020 Vision: Finding Hope in Climate Action.

Views
In 2016, McKibben wrote in The New York Times that he is "under surveillance" by "right-wing stalkers" who photograph, pursue, and inquire about him and members of his family in search of ostensible instances of environmental hypocrisy. "I'm being watched", he reported. Two years later, he wrote in the Times that he had been receiving death threats since the 1990s.

In December 2019, along with 42 other leading cultural figures, McKibben signed a letter endorsing the British Labour Party under Jeremy Corbyn's leadership in the 2019 general election. The letter stated that "Labour's election manifesto under Jeremy Corbyn's leadership offers a transformative plan that prioritizes the needs of people and the planet over private profit and the vested interests of a few."

Personal life
McKibben resides in Ripton, Vermont, with his wife, writer Sue Halpern. Their only child, Sophie, was born in 1993 in Glens Falls, New York. He is a Schumann Distinguished Scholar at Middlebury College, where he also directs the Middlebury Fellowships in Environmental Journalism. McKibben is also a fellow at the Post Carbon Institute. He is a longtime Methodist.

Since 2013, McKibben has been listed on the Advisory Council of the National Center for Science Education.

Awards
McKibben has been awarded both a Guggenheim Fellowship (1993) and a Lyndhurst Fellowship. 
He won a Lannan Literary Award for nonfiction writing in 2000. 
In 2010, Utne Reader magazine listed McKibben as one of the "25 Visionaries Who Are Changing Your World."
He has honorary degrees from Whittier College, Marlboro College, Colgate University, the State University of New York, Sterling College, Green Mountain College, Unity College, and Lebanon Valley College.
He won the Puffin/Nation Prize for Creative Citizenship in 2010, for his work with 350.org
McKibben was the recipient of the  Sierra Club's highest honor in 2011, the John Muir Award.
In 2012, he won the Sam Rose and Julie Walters Prize for Global Environmental Activism at Dickinson College; accepting the prize, he told the graduating Dickinson students that, in addition to be the greatest problem of their lives, global climate change is the greatest challenge that has ever confronted human society. 
In 2013, he won the international environment and development prize Sophie Prize. 
McKibben and 350.org were awarded the Right Livelihood Award in 2014 for mobilizing growing popular support in the United States and around the world for strong action to counter the threat of global climate change".

Bibliography

Books 
 
The Age of Missing Information (1992) , challenges Marshall McLuhan's "global village" ideal and claims the standardization of life in electronic media is that of image and not substance, resulting in a loss of meaningful content in society
 Hope, Human and Wild: True Stories of Living Lightly on the Earth (1995) 
Maybe One: A Personal and Environmental Argument for Single Child Families (1998) 
Hundred Dollar Holiday (1998) 
 Long Distance: Testing the Limits of Body and Spirit in a Year of Living Strenuously (2001) 
Enough: Staying Human in an Engineered Age (2003) 
Wandering Home (2005) 
 The Comforting Whirlwind: God, Job, and the Scale of Creation (2005) 
 Deep Economy: The Wealth of Communities and the Durable Future (2007) 
 Reviewed in Tim Flannery, "We're Living on Corn!" The New York Review of Books 54/11 (28 June 2007) : 26-28
 Fight Global Warming Now: The Handbook for Taking Action in Your Community (2007) 
 The Bill McKibben Reader: Pieces from an Active Life (2008) 
 American Earth: Environmental Writing Since Thoreau (edited) (2008) 
 Eaarth: Making a Life on a Tough New Planet (2010) 
 The Global Warming Reader (OR Books, 2011) 
 Oil and Honey: The Education of an Unlikely Activist (Times Books, 2013) 
 Radio Free Vermont: A Fable of Resistance. (Blue Rider Press, 2017) 
Falter: Has the Human Game Begun to Play Itself Out?. Description & arrow/scrollable preview. (Henry Holt and Co., 2019) 
We Are Better Together, (Henry Holt and Co., 2022) ISBN 9781250755155
The Flag, the Cross, and the Station Wagon: A Graying American Looks Back at His Suburban Boyhood and Wonders What the Hell Happened (Henry Holt and Co., 2022) ISBN 9781250823601

Essays and reporting 
 
 
 
 
 
 
 
 

———————
Notes

Filmography

Broadcasts

Documentary film 

 Do The Math (2013), 42-minute documentary (written and directed by Kelly Nyks and Jared Scott) on fossil fuel phase-out and fossil fuel divestment, featuring him

See also
Individual and political action on climate change

References

Notes

Citations

External links

 Official website
 Articles by Bill McKibben at The New Yorker
 
 
 Review of 'Eaarth: Making a Life on a Tough New Planet'  at Mother Nature Network
 Keystone: How Bill McKibben Turned a Pipeline into an Environmental Rallying Point March 5, 2012
 Bill McKibben's Battle Against the Keystone XL Pipeline February 28, 2013 BusinessWeek
 "The Singularity" a documentary film featuring McKibben
“Focus; The End of Nature,” 1989-11-29, WILL Illinois Public Media, American Archive of Public Broadcasting (GBH and the Library of Congress), Boston, MA and Washington, DC.

1960 births
20th-century Methodists
21st-century Methodists
American environmentalists
American non-fiction environmental writers
American United Methodists
Climate activists
The Harvard Crimson people
Lexington High School alumni
Living people
Middlebury College faculty
Neo-Luddites
People from Lexington, Massachusetts
Sierra Club awardees
The New Yorker staff writers
Writers from Vermont